Stephen Sewall (March 24, 1734 – July 23, 1804) was an American professor of Hebrew and Oriental languages at Harvard University. He was a charter member of the American Academy of Arts and Sciences (1780) and was considered one of the greatest scholars of his generation.

He replaced Judah Monis as the lecturer in Hebrew at his alma mater shortly after he graduated in 1761.

References
Goldman, Yosef. Hebrew Printing in America, 1735-1926, A History and Annotated Bibliography (YGBooks 2006). .
Papers of Stephen Sewall, 1764-1797

Notes

1734 births
1804 deaths
American lexicographers
Fellows of the American Academy of Arts and Sciences
Harvard University alumni
Harvard University faculty
New Latin-language poets
18th-century lexicographers
Linguists from the United States